Bartholomew I (born 29 February 1940) is
the 270th archbishop of Constantinople and Ecumenical Patriarch, since 2 November 1991. In accordance with his title, he is regarded as the primus inter pares (first among equals) in the Eastern Orthodox Church, and as the spiritual leader of the Eastern Orthodox Christians worldwide.

Bartholomew I was born as Dimitrios Arhondonis, in the village of Agios Theodoros on the island of Imbros (later renamed Gökçeada by Turkey). After his graduation, he held a position at the Patriarchal Theological Seminary of Halki, where he was ordained a priest. Later, he served as metropolitan of Philadelphia and Chalcedon and he became a member of the Holy Synod as well as other committees, prior to his enthronement as ecumenical patriarch.

Bartholomew's tenure has been characterized by intra-Orthodox cooperation, intra-Christian and inter-religious dialogue, and formal visits to Roman Catholic, Old Catholic, Orthodox and Muslim leaders seldom previously visited by an ecumenical patriarch. He has exchanged numerous invitations with church and state dignitaries. His efforts to promote religious freedom and human rights, his initiatives to advance religious tolerance among the world's religions, as well as his efforts to promote ecology and the protection of the environment, have been widely noted, and these endeavors have earned him the title "The Green Patriarch". Among his many international positions, he currently sits on the Board of World Religious Leaders for the Elijah Interfaith Institute. In 2018 the Moscow Patriarchate broke communion with the Ecumenical Patriarchate as a result of disputes over his decision to grant autocephaly to the Orthodox Church of Ukraine.

Early life and background
Dimitrios Arhondonis was born in the village of Agioi Theodoroi on the island of Imbros (now Gökçeada, Turkey), son of Christos and Meropi Archodónis (née Skarlatos), both of Greek descent. He was the fourth and last child and as a boy helped his father in his coffee shop that also doubled as a barber's.

Bartholomew I was the target of an assassination plot which was planned to take place on 29 May 2013. One suspect was arrested and there is an ongoing search for two others.

Ordinations and ecclesiastical appointments
13 August 1961, Diaconate – receiving the ecclesiastical name Bartholomew
19 October 1969, Priesthood
25 December 1973, The Nativity, Episcopacy – Metropolitan of Philadelphia (Asia Minor)
14 January 1990, Enthronement as metropolitan of Chalcedon
22 October 1991, Elected 270th archbishop of Constantinople, New Rome and ecumenical patriarch
2 November 1991, Enthronement in the Patriarchal Cathedral in the Phanar

Patriarchate

As ecumenical patriarch, he has been particularly active internationally. One of his first focuses has been on rebuilding the once-persecuted Eastern Orthodox churches of the former Eastern Bloc following the fall of Communism there in 1990. As part of this effort he has worked to strengthen ties among the various national churches and patriarchates of the Eastern Orthodox Church. He has also continued the reconciliation dialogue with the Roman Catholic Church started by his predecessors, and initiated dialogue with other faiths, including other Christian Churches, Muslims, and Jews.

Environmentalism

He has also gained a reputation as a prominent environmentalist, putting the support of the Ecumenical Patriarchate behind various international environmental causes. This has earned him the nicknames of "the Green Patriarch" and "the Green Pope", and in 2002 he was honored with the Sophie Prize for his contribution to environmentalism. He has also been honoured with the Congressional Gold Medal, the highest award which may be bestowed by the Legislative Branch of the United States government.

Turkey
In an interview published on 19 November 2006 in the daily newspaper Sabah, Bartholomew I addressed the issues of religious freedom and the then upcoming papal trip to Turkey. He also referred to the closing of the Halki seminary by saying: "As Turkish citizens, we pay taxes. We serve in the military. We vote. As citizens we do everything. We want the same rights. But it does not happen... If Muslims want to study theology, there are 24 theology faculties. Where are we going to study?" He also addressed the issue of his ecumenical title and it not being accepted by the Turkish government: "We've had this title since the 6th century... The word ecumenical has no political content. [...] This title is the only thing that I insist on. I will never renounce this title."

Ecumenical dialogue
During his trip to Turkey in November 2006, Pope Benedict XVI traveled to Istanbul on the invitation of the Ecumenical Patriarch of Constantinople Bartholomew I. The Pope participated in the feast day services of St. Andrew the First Apostle, the patron saint of the Church of Constantinople. This was the third official visit to the Ecumenical Patriarchate by a pope (the first being by Paul VI in 1967, and the second by John Paul II in 1979). He attended the Papal inauguration of Pope Francis on 19 March 2013, paving the way for better Catholic–Orthodox relations. It was the first time that the spiritual head of Eastern Orthodox Christians had attended a papal inauguration since the Great Schism in 1054. After, he invited Pope Francis to travel with him to the Holy Land in 2014 to mark the fiftieth anniversary of the embrace between Patriarch Athenagoras and Pope Paul VI. Pope Francis was also invited to the Patriarchate for the feast day of Saint Andrew (30 November).

Support of refugees, reunification and peace
On 16 April 2016 he visited, together with Pope Francis and Archbishop Hieronymus, the Moria Refugee Camp in the island of Lesbos, to call the attention of the world to the refugee issue. In December 2018, he visited the Korean DMZ and prayed for permanent peace and unification on the Korean Peninsula.

Autocephaly of the Orthodox Church of Ukraine

In October 2018 the synod of the Ecumenical Patriarchate agreed to grant autocephaly (independence) to the Orthodox Church in Ukraine, to reestablish a stauropegion of the ecumenical patriarch in Kyiv, to revoke the legal binding of the letter of 1686 which led to the Russian Orthodox Church establishing jurisdiction over the Ukrainian Church, and to lift the excommunications which affected clergy and faithful of two then unrecognized Orthodox churches in Ukraine, the Ukrainian Autocephalous Orthodox Church (UAOC) and the Ukrainian Orthodox Church – Kyiv Patriarchate (UOC-KP). In response, the Russian Orthodox Church announced it was cutting ties with the Ecumenical Patriarchate, which marked the beginning of the 2018 Moscow–Constantinople schism.

On 5 January 2019, Ecumenical Patriarch Bartholomew granted autocephaly to the newly founded Orthodox Church of Ukraine.

Possession of Vatican St. Peter Bone Fragments
On 2 July 2019, it was announced that Pope Francis had given Ecumenical Patriarch Bartholomew possession of nine bone fragments believed to belong to St. Peter and which were publicly displayed by Pope Francis in November 2013 during a Vatican 'Year of Faith' Mass. Bartholomew, who also gained possession of the bronze reliquary which they are displayed in, described the Pope's gesture as "brave and bold."

Macedonian Orthodox Church 
In 2022, the Ecumenical Patriarchate accepted the Macedonian Orthodox Church – Archdiocese of Ohrid into communion, recognized North Macedonia as a canonical jurisdiction.

Titles

Distinctions

Orders
 : Order of Saint King David the Psalmist by Prince Nugzar Bagration-Gruzinsky of Georgia (27 August 2015) in a private ceremony in the patriarchal palace
 : Order of Liberty (27 July 2013) and Order of Merit 1st class (5 January 2019)
 : Order of the White Double Cross by President Ivan Gašparovič (27 May 27, 2013)
 House of Mukhrani: Grand Collar of the Order of the Eagle of Georgia (22 October 2011) by Prince David Bagration of Mukhrani at Saint George's chapel.
 : Order of the Golden Fleece (Georgia)

Academic
He received an honorary doctorate from the Hankuk University of Foreign Studies in South Korea on 23 June 2005.

In October 2009, he received an honorary doctorate from Fordham University in the United States.

He received an honorary PhD. from The Hebrew University in Jerusalem on 6 December 2017.

In December 2018, he received an honorary doctorate from the National University of Kyiv-Mohyla Academy in Ukraine.

In October 2021, he received an honorary degree from the University of Notre Dame in the United States.

Other
On 1 November 2021, he received the Human Dignity Award from American Jewish Committee (AJC), the premier global Jewish advocacy organization. The AJC honor recognizes Bartholomew's singular care for humanity and the environment, exceptional commitment to interreligious coexistence, and indispensable advancement of Orthodox-Jewish relations.

On 3 December 2013, he received the Global Thinkers Forum 2013 Award for Excellence in Peace and Collaboration.

In 2012, he received the Four Freedom Award for the Freedom of Worship.

In 1997, Bartholomew received the Congressional Gold Medal. The Congressional Gold Medal and the Presidential Medal of Freedom are the highest civilian awards given by the United States.

In 2002, he received the Sophie Prize for his work on the environment.

In April 2008, he was included on the Time 100 most influential people in the world list. On 13 March 2007, the third anniversary of the death of Cardinal Franz König, Bartholomew was awarded in Vienna's St. Stephen Cathedral the "Cardinal König Prize" from the Foundation "Communio et Progressio".

In October 2022, he was one of the first faith leaders to have an audience with King Charles III.

See also
Archons of the Ecumenical Patriarchate
Church of St George, Istanbul
Ecumenism
Greek Orthodox Archdiocese of America
History of the Eastern Orthodox Church
List of current Christian leaders
List of ecumenical patriarchs of Constantinople
Mount Athos
Patriarch Athenagoras I of Constantinople

Reference notes

References

External links

 Official biography
 Ecumenical Patriarch Bartholomew: A Passion for Peace
 A Patriarch in Dire Straits by John Couretas, director of communications at the Acton Institute and executive director of the American Orthodox Institute.
 End of Byzantium interview by Helena Drysdale from Aeon Magazine.

1940 births
People from Imbros
Living people
20th-century Ecumenical Patriarchs of Constantinople
21st-century Ecumenical Patriarchs of Constantinople
Eastern Orthodox Christians from Turkey
Grand Crosses of the Order of the Star of Romania
Honorary members of the Romanian Academy
Congressional Gold Medal recipients
Recipients of the Grand Decoration with Sash for Services to the Republic of Austria
Recipients of the Order of the Cross of Terra Mariana, 1st Class
Turkish environmentalists
Turkish people of Greek descent
Theological School of Halki alumni
Greek Orthodoxy in Turkey
Bishops of Chalcedon
Recipients of the Four Freedoms Award
Recipients of the Order of Prince Yaroslav the Wise, 1st class